Sakangyi is a town in Taunggyi Township in Taunggyi District in the Shan State of eastern Burma. It is located west along National Highway 4 from Aye Thar Yar and Taunggyi. The National Road 43 begins in the eastern part of the town and connects National Highway 4 to National Highway 3 in the north at Nawnghkio. It is connected via National Highway 4 to Heho in the west.

References

External links
Maplandia World Gazetteer

Populated places in Taunggyi District
Taunggyi Township